Rapid Fire Theatre (RFT) is an improvisational theatre company based in Edmonton, Alberta, Canada.

History
The origins of the company stretch to 1981, when Edmonton's Theatre Network became the third company in the world to regularly produce Keith Johnstone's Theatresports. The Artistic Director of Theatre Network at the time, Stephen Heatley, brought the high-energy format to Edmonton, and eventually, performers from the show formed Rapid Fire Theatre, which officially became its own theatre company in 1988. Rapid Fire Theatre performed originally at the Phoenix Theatre in Downtown Edmonton until 1990 when it moved to The Chinook Theatre in Old Strathcona, which became the Varscona Theatre in 1994. Rapid Fire Theatre performed there until 2012, and was part of the Varscona Theatre Alliance, along with Teatro la Quindicina and Shadow Theatre.  In September 2012, Rapid Fire Theatre moved back north of the river to Zeidler Hall at the Citadel Theatre complex, as announced by Maria Bamford. In 2013 Rapid Fire Theatre launched a capital campaign with the goal of building their own theatre.

Artistic Directors
 Stephen Heatley (Theatre Network)
 Jack Smith 1988–1991
 Patti Stiles 1991–1995
 Jacob Banigan 1995–2004
 Chris Craddock  2005–2009
 Kevin Gillese 2009–2010
 Amy Shostak 2010–2015
 Matt Schuurman 2015–Present

Shows
RFT currently produces two weekly shows: Theatresports and the long form improv show Chimprov. Some members of Rapid Fire Theatre have produced or performed in sketch comedy shows. Other shows previously produced by RFT over the years have included Gorilla Theatre, Catch 23 and The 11:02 Show, as well as main stage productions like  "On Being a Peon" and "The Critic", penned by RFT member Chris Craddock, as well as collaborative projects like “Fairytales Scratched” (Kevin Gillese & Arlen Konopaki), “A Watched Pot Never Boyles” (Amy Shostak & Arlen Konopaki),  and “Kiss My Bus” (Amy Shostak, Kirsten Rasmussen, and Clarice Eckford). In 2011, Rapid Fire Theatre marked the 30th season of Theatresports in Edmonton with an Alumni Weekend.

Improvaganza
RFT also hosts an annual international improvisation festival, Improvaganza, which brings improv artists from across the world together every June. The festival is partially funded by the Government of Canada.

Guests 
Past guest artists at Improvaganza have included The Sunday Service, CRUMBS, Picnicface, The Pajama Men, Maria Bamford, Convoy (Upright Citizens Brigade), Neil Hamburger, Standards and Practices, Showstopper! The Improvised Musical, Moshe Kasher, Doppelganger, La Gata, The School of Night, Det Andre Teatret, Et Compagnie, Mantown, Dad's Garage Theatre Company, Die Gorillas, Iron Cobra, Loose Moose Theatre, Teater Narobov and Unexpected Productions.

Musical Guests 
Musical guests have included The Magnificent Sevens, Gift of Gab, Mass Choir, Christian Hansen & The Autistics, The Famines, Doug Hoyer, Rah Rah, The Joe, Mikey Maybe, and Mitchmatic.

Awards
Rapid Fire Theatre has received several awards, including a special Elizabeth Sterling Haynes Award for excellence in theatre. Rapid Fire was named Best Theatre Company by VUE Weekly readers in 2012, 2013, 2014 and 2015 as well as Edmonton's Favourite Live Theatre Company by the Edmonton Journal in 2014. In 2013, the company also won a Canadian Comedy Award for Best Comedy Short for Internet Search History Revealed.

Touring
Members of the company have performed across the world, including multiple appearances at the Berlin International Improv Festival, The Wurzburger Improtheaterfestival, The Chicago Improv Festival (CIF), The Vancouver International Improv Festival (VIIF), The Winnipeg International Improv Festival (IF), The Canadian Comedy Award Showcases (Toronto), The St. Valentine’s Day Massacre Theatresports Tournament hosted by Vancouver Theatresports League, and the World Domination Theatresports Tournament presented annually in Atlanta by Dad's Garage Theatre Company.

Performers

Current 
Current performers at Rapid Fire Theatre include: 

 Joleen Ballendine
 Paul Blinov
 Chris Borger
 Joey Lucius
 Gordie Lucius
 Kelly Turner
 Joe Vanderhelm
 Julian Faid
 Todd Houseman
 Kory Mathewson
 Marg Lawler

 Jessie McPhee
 Mark Meer
 Tim Mikula
 Matt Schuurman
 Syd Campbell
 Sarah Ormandy

Notable alumni
Players and alumni of Rapid Fire Theatre include:

 Dana Andersen
 Jacob Banigan
 Wes Borg
 Marty Chan

 Chris Craddock
 Josh Dean 
 Nathan Fillion
 Kevin Gillese
 Paul Mather

 Ron Pederson
 Jan Randall
 Cathleen Rootsaert
 Patti Stiles
 Neil Grahn
 Donovan Workun
 Kirsten Rasmussen

See also
 Improvisational theatre

References

External links
 Official Site

Nightclubs in Alberta
Improvisational theatre in Canada
Theatre in Edmonton
Theatre companies in Alberta
Companies based in Edmonton
Comedy clubs in Canada
Canadian comedy troupes